The 415th Bombardment Group is an inactive United States Air Force unit that served primarily as a training and demonstration unit. It was last part of Second Air Force, at Dalhart Army Air Field, Texas, where it was disbanded on 5 April 1944.  In July 1985, the group was reconstituted as the 415th Tactical Missile Wing, but has not been active as a missile unit.

History
The 415th Bombardment Group was activated during World War II as a Third Air Force training and demonstration unit as part of the Army Air Force School of Applied Tactics. It was equipped with A-20s, A-24s, A-26s, B-25s, and P-39s. The group was reassigned to Second Air Force in early 1944 as a B-17 Flying Fortress replacement training unit. It was inactivated in early 1944 when the need for B-17 aircrews diminished.

The 415th was reconstituted in inactive status as the 415th Tactical Missile Wing on 31 July 1985.

Lineage
 Constituted as the 415th Bombardment Group (Light) on 12 February 1943
 Activated on 15 February 1943
 Disbanded on 5 April 1944
 Reconstituted as the 415th Tactical Missile Wing on 31 July 1985

Assignments
 Army Air Force School of Applied Tactics, 15 February 1943
 II Bomber Command, 19 March–5 April 1944

Components
 465th Bombardment Squadron: 23 March 1943 – 5 April 1944
 521st Fighter-Bomber (formerly 667th) Bombardment Squadron: 15 February 1943 – 5 April 1944

Stations
 Alachua Army Airfield, Florida, 15 February 1943
 Orlando Army Air Base, Florida, 25 February 1944
 Dalhart Army Air Field, Texas, 19 March–5 April 1944

References

Notes

Bibliography

 
 

Bombardment groups of the United States Army Air Forces
Military units and formations established in 1943